Black Label may refer to:

Businesses and products
 Black Label Media, an American film and multimedia production company
 The Black Label, a South Korean record label
 Carling Black Label, a Canadian beer brand
 DC Black Label, a DC Comics label
 Johnnie Walker Black Label, a Scotch whisky blend
 LG Black Label Series, a line of mobile phones
 Black Label, a trim package for Lincoln Motor Company vehicles
 Black Label Games, a subsidiary of Vivendi Games

Music
 Black Label (Fiestar EP), 2015
 Black Label (Ocean Grove EP), 2015
 "Black Label", a song by Lamb of God from New American Gospel, 2000

Other uses
 Black Label Bike Club, an international bicycle club founded in Minneapolis, Minnesota, US
 Black Label, a 2011–2014 spin-off of the manga series Nana & Kaoru

See also
 Black Label Society, an American heavy metal band